Pixna (Pixina, Pishna;  / ) is a town in Pishan/Guma County, Hotan Prefecture, Xinjiang, China.

History
Before the Communist takeover, the area was organized as Pixna District (Pixinai).

In 1958, Pixna Commune was established.

In 1984, Pixna Township was established.

Administrative divisions
Pixna includes seven villages:

Villages (Mandarin Chinese Hanyu Pinyin-derived names):
Jiayituogelake (Jiayituo Gelakecun), Wukashi, Bulakebeixi, Pixina, Yangtake, Bashi'azigan, Ayage'azigan

References

Populated places in Xinjiang
Township-level divisions of Xinjiang